Merklin or Merklín may refer to:

Military
 Air battle over Merklín

Places
 Merklín (Karlovy Vary District)
 Merklín (Plzeň-South District)

People
 Joseph Merklin (1819-1905), German-born organ builder